Nurullah Sağlam (born 28 January 1966) is a UEFA Pro Licensed Turkish football manager.

He was also a footballer as defender and played for Gaziantepspor (1984–1990), Kayserispor (1990–1991), Elazığspor (1991–1992), Edirnespor (1992–1997) and İslahiyespor (1997–1999).

Nurullah became coach of Gaziantepspor, leading them to the third round of the UEFA Cup. They won the first leg 1–0 against Fabio Capello's Roma side, but in the second leg, Gaziantepspor fell to a 2–0 defeat and got knocked out of the competition.

Sağlam managed Diyarbakırspor for 2009–10 season. He became the champions of 2010–11 TFF First League with Mersin İdmanyurdu. At the end of the season, he signed a contract with Mersin İdmanyurdu for three seasons.

References

External links
Nurullah Sağlam official website

1966 births
Living people
Turkish footballers
Gaziantepspor footballers
Kayserispor footballers
Elazığspor footballers
Turkish football managers
Süper Lig managers
Mersin İdman Yurdu managers
Konyaspor managers
Denizlispor managers
Gaziantepspor managers
Karşıyaka S.K. managers
Association football midfielders